Ư (lowercase ư) is one of the 12 Vietnamese language vowels. It is pronounced .

As with most special Vietnamese letters, this letter is not well-supported by fonts and is often typed as either u+ or u*. The VIQR standard is u+.

Because Vietnamese is a tonal language this letter may optionally have any one of the 5 tonal symbols above or below it.
Ừ ừ
Ứ ứ
Ử ử
Ữ ữ
Ự ự

Character mappings

See also
 Ơ
 Horn (diacritic)

Vietnamese language
Latin letters with diacritics
Vowel letters
Vietnamese alphabets